Gloria Kamba (born on July 18) is a Ugandan radio personality who was the first presenter of the 88.2 Sanyu FM weekday breakfast show "The Early Riser" and the Sunday mid morning show "The Intimate Connection" She is recognized as one of the original female FM radio stars in Uganda.

In the 1980s, she was known as Gloria Nekesa while at Namasagali College.

Background 
She is currently living in the UK.

References

External links 
Kampala Express Facebook explanation about Gloria Kamba
Website of Sanyu FM.
Gloria Kamba on YouTube
Gloria Kamba's Album.

Ugandan women journalists
Ugandan journalists
Ugandan radio journalists
Ugandan women radio journalists
Ugandan radio presenters
Ugandan women radio presenters
Living people
Year of birth missing (living people)